The Lac de Payolle is an artificial lake in the French Pyrenees. It is located in the communes of Campan and Arreau of the Hautes-Pyrénées department in the Midi-Pyrénées region. Its western shore is the boundary between the communes of Ancizan and Arreau. It is usually completely frozen in winter.

Geography
It is located at the foot of the Col d'Aspin at  altitude.

Tourism
The lake is an important tourist resort centre: Payolle ski resort, where various activities are practiced such as mountain biking, orienteering, cross-country skiing, snowshoeing, dog sleds, horse or pony rides, paragliding, hiking, etc.

On the lake, fishing is practiced. A tourist fishing route was also laid out around the lake with gateways for fisherman, but also various watersports such as canoeing and sailing.

Sport
Stage 7 of the 2016 Tour de France will finish at the lake on 8 July 2016.

See also

Col d'Aspin

References

Lakes of Hautes-Pyrénées